Punnin Kovapitukted  (born 5 February 2003) is a Thai tennis player.
She has a career-high WTA singles ranking of 653, achieved on 1 July 2019, and a career-high doubles ranking of 656, achieved on 22 November 2021. She has won one singles title and eight doubles titles on the ITF Circuit.

ITF Circuit finals

Singles: 1 (1 title)

Doubles: 15 (8 titles, 7 runner–ups)

References

External links
 
 
 

Punnin Kovapitukted
2003 births
Living people
Punnin Kovapitukted